Brad Beyer (born September 20, 1973) is an American actor. He may be best-known for his role in the CBS series Jericho, playing Stanley Richmond.

Early and personal life
Beyer was born in Waukesha, Wisconsin, where he graduated from Catholic Memorial High School (Class of 1991). He briefly attended the University of Minnesota before heading for Los Angeles.  Beyer currently resides in Los Angeles.

Career

Beyer was cast on the pilot of ABC's Roman's Empire opposite Kelsey Grammer.  The pilot did not move forward but it did help Beyer to be cast in his next role on GCB, playing Zack Peacham.

His film roles include the films Mr. Woodcock, Sorority Boys, Trick, The General's Daughter, and Crazy in Alabama.  Beyer had a role in the 2013 movie 42 as Major League Baseball player Kirby Higbe.

Theatrical roles include The Chili Queen, Lighting Up the Two Year Old (for The Actors Studio), and Wonderland (at The American Place Theatre).

Beyer played an recurring role on NBC’s Third Watch. He has appeared on Sex and The City, Lie To Me, NCIS: Los Angeles, Criminal Minds, CSI: Miami, Law & Order, and Law & Order: SVU.  Beyer starred as Don Meredith in the TNT original telefilm, Monday Night Mayhem.  In 2012, Beyer was featured in a two-part episode of NCIS. His character was a war veteran suffering from PTSD who helps foil a domestic terror plot.

Filmography

References

External links

American male film actors
American male television actors
People from Waukesha, Wisconsin
Male actors from Wisconsin
University of Minnesota alumni
1973 births
Living people